There are at least 80 named lakes and reservoirs in Lake County, Montana.

Lakes
 Ashley Lakes, el. 
 Black Lake, el. 
 Blacktail Lake, el. 
 Bond Lake, el. 
 Cat Lake, el. 
 Cedar Lake, el. 
 Cliff Lake, el. 
 Courville Lake, el. 
 Crow Creek Lakes, el. 
 Disappointment Lake, el. 
 Dry Lake, el. 
 Dry Lake, el. 
 Ducharm Lake, el. 
 Duncan Lake, el. 
 Estes Lake, el. 
 Fatty Lake, el. 
 First Lake, el. 
 Flathead Lake, el. 
 Frog Lakes, el. 
 Hall Lake, el. 
 Horseshoe Lake, el. 
 Icefloe Lake, el. 
 Jette Lake, el. 
 Lake Mary Ronan, el. 
 Lake of the Clouds, el. 
 Lake of the Stars, el. 
 Long Lake, el. 
 Loon Lake, el. 
 Loon Lake, el. 
 Lost Lake, el. 
 Lower Riddell Lake, el. 
 Lucifer Lake, el. 
 McDonald Lake, el. 
 Metcalf Lake, el. 
 Mikes Pond, el. 
 Moon Lake, el. 
 Moore Lake, el. 
 Mud Lake, el. 
 No Fish Lake, el. 
 Peck Lake, el. 
 Picture Lake, el. 
 Piper Lake, el. 
 Pony Lake, el. 
 Rainbow Lake, el. 
 Ravalli Potholes, el. 
 Red Lake, el. 
 Row Lake, el. 
 Scenic Lakes, el. 
 Scout Lake, el. 
 Seeley Lake
 Shay Lake, el. 
 Skags Lake, el. 
 Sloan Lake, el. 
 Sonielem Lake, el. 
 Summit Lake, el. 
 Swan Lake, el. 
 Swartz Lake, el. 
 Terrace Lake, el. 
 Trinkus Lake, el. 
 Twin Lakes, el. 
 Upper Riddell Lake, el. 
 Van Lake, el. 
 Webb Lake, el. 
 Weed Lake, el. 
 Wymore Lake, el.

Reservoirs
 Crow Reservoir, el. 
 Flathead Lake, el. 
 Hellroaring Reservoir, el. 
 Hillside Reservoir, el. 
 Horte Reservoir, el. 
 Kicking Horse Dam, el. 
 Lower Crow Reservoir, el. 
 McDonald Lake, el. 
 Mission Reservoir, el. 
 Ninepipe Reservoir, el. 
 Pablo Reservoir, el. 
 Pablo Reservoir, el. 
 Saint Marys Lake, el. 
 Saint Marys Lake, el. 
 Turtle Lake, el.

See also
 List of lakes in Montana

Notes

Bodies of water of Lake County, Montana
Lake